TZN – The Best of Tiziano Ferro is the first greatest hits album by Italian singer-songwriter Tiziano Ferro. It was released on 25 November 2014. It contains all of his singles, five new songs, and three older songs of which only the demos had previously surfaced. The deluxe edition adds a rarities disc with more new material, and a duets disc. The special fan edition includes two DVDs with all of Ferro's music videos.

Singles
The album's lead single was "Senza scappare mai più", released on 17 October 2014. It peaked at No. 2 on the Italian Singles Chart. Italian media pointed out that the song was not gender-neutral, and was therefore the first song by a popular Italian artist that was explicitly about love between two men.

The second single "Incanto" was released on 16 January 2015. Ferro described it as "extremely different" from his previous work due to its folk sound. He wrote it together with Emanuele Dabbono.

Track listing

Standard edition

Deluxe edition

International edition

Internationally, a single disc version of the album was released.

Charts

Weekly charts

Year-end charts

Certifications

References

Tiziano Ferro compilation albums
2014 greatest hits albums
Music video compilation albums
Italian-language compilation albums
Spanish-language compilation albums
Italian-language albums
Spanish-language albums
Albums produced by Michele Canova